Jesse Elliston (3 March 1806 – 26 July 1853) was a proprietor of Elliston & Cavell, which became the leading department store in Oxford, England.

Elliston was born in Ipswich, Suffolk, to James and Mary Ann Elliston. He was baptised a Baptist. He owned a draper's shop in central Oxford when his sister, Sarah Elliston of Summertown in north Oxford, married John Cavell on 9 April 1835. As a result, Elliston made Cavell a partner of the shop, which then became known as Elliston & Cavell. It went on to become the largest department store in Oxford for many years, until its eventual conversion to a Debenhams store.

In 1853, after feeling unwell for a week, the 47-year-old Elliston collapsed and died suddenly while walking in the Banbury Road on his way to Summertown. Cavell subsequently took over the running of the shop.

References

External links 
 John Caldicott Cavell, Mayor of Oxford

1806 births
1853 deaths
British businesspeople in retailing
Debenhams
Businesspeople from Oxford
19th-century British businesspeople